The politics of Liaoning Province in the People's Republic of China is structured in a single party-government system like all other governing institutions in mainland China.

The Governor of Liaoning is the highest-ranking official in the People's Government of Liaoning. However, in the province's single party-government governing system, the Governor has less power than the Liaoning Chinese Communist Party (CCP) Provincial Committee Secretary, colloquially termed the "Liaoning CCP Party Chief".

Previous to 1949 and the takeover of the Communist forces, Liaoning was governed by the Fengtian Clique of warlords and interchangeably officials of the Chiang Kai-shek bureaucracy. During the Qing Dynasty Liaoning was known as the province of Fengtian, and was governed by a zongdu or Viceroy (The Viceroy of the Three Eastern Provinces 东三省总督), along with the provinces of Jilin and Heilongjiang. The province itself also had a governor (xunfu).

List of Communist Party chiefs

List of governors

List of chairmen of Liaoning People's Congress
Huang Oudong: 1980–1983
Zhang Zhengde: 1983–1988
Wang Guangzhong: 1988–1993
Quan Shuren:1993–1998
Wang Huaiyuan: 1998–2003
Wen Shizhen: 2003–2005
Li Keqiang: 2005–2007
Zhang Xilin: 2007–2010
Wang Min: 2010–2015
Li Xi: 2015– 2018
Chen Qiufa: 2018 - 2021
Zhang Guoqing: 2021–present

List of chairmen of Liaoning CPPCC
Huang Oudong: 1955–1959
Huang Huoqing: 1959–1967
Huang Oudong: 1977–1980
Li Huang: 1980–1982
Song Li: 1982–1985
Xu Shaofu: 1985–1993
Sun Qi: 1993–2001
Xiao Zuofu: 2001–2003
Zhang Wenyue: 2003–2004
Guo Tingbiao: 2004–2008
Luo Lin: 2008
Yue Fuhong: 2009–2013
Xia Deren: 2013– 2021
Zhou Bo: 2021–present

See also 
Politics of the People's Republic of China

Liaoning

Liaoning
Liaoning, governors